George Darling (born 1950) is a British former sports shooter.

Sports shooting career
Darling represented England and won a gold medal in the 10 metres air pistol and a silver medal in the 10 metres air pistol pair with Geoffrey Robinson, at the 1982 Commonwealth Games in Brisbane, Queensland, Australia.

References

1950 births
Living people
British male sport shooters
Shooters at the 1982 Commonwealth Games
Commonwealth Games medallists in shooting
Commonwealth Games gold medallists for England
Commonwealth Games silver medallists for England
Medallists at the 1982 Commonwealth Games